The Brunswick Commercial Historic District encompasses the historic late-19th century commercial core of Brunswick, Maine.  It includes the northern four blocks of Maine Street, the town's principal commercial thoroughfare, which was laid out in the late 17th century.  The district was listed on the National Register of Historic Places in 2016.

Description and history
The town of Brunswick's early colonial history begins with the establishment of Fort Andross, on the south bank of the Androscoggin River near the former Cabot Mill site, in about 1688.  From this fortification a wide road was made to the shores of Maquoit Bay to the south, which became what is now called Maine street.  The town of Brunswick was chartered in 1737, and was initially powered economically by mills along the river, and by maritime trade.  Bowdoin College was chartered in 1794, with its campus south of the commercial district, and the mills were expanded in the 19th century, especially after the railroad arrived in 1849.  In the 20th century, Brunswick Naval Air Station, southeast of the downtown, also provided an economic benefit to the region.

The historic consists of the northern four blocks of Maine Street, including most of the buildings between Mill and Pleasant Streets.  These buildings are typically one or two stories in height, either of brick or frame construction.  Most of them are Colonial Revival in style, although a number of earlier 19th century revival styles are also represented.  Retail storefronts predominate on the ground floors, with professional offices or residences on the upper floors.  One architecturally prominent building is Lemont Block at Maine and Pleasant: it is a three-story brick Second Empire structure built in 1870.

See also
National Register of Historic Places listings in Cumberland County, Maine

References

External links

Historic districts on the National Register of Historic Places in Maine
Colonial Revival architecture in Maine
Brunswick, Maine
National Register of Historic Places in Cumberland County, Maine